Red River Dave McEnery (born David Largus McEnery) (December 15, 1914 – January 15, 2002) was an American artist, musician, and writer of topical songs.  He was born in San Antonio, Texas, United States. He got the nickname "Red River Dave" because he enjoyed singing "Red River Valley" in high school.  He was the leader of The Swift Cowboys.

Career
As a teenager, he appeared regularly on KABC radio.
Dave began his career by singing, yodeling, and performing rope tricks at rodeos. In 1936, he broadcast a live singing performance from the Goodyear Blimp over CBS AM radio station WQAM in Miami.
His career really took off with his song "Amelia Earhart's Last Flight", broadcast in a pioneer television broadcast from the 1939 New York World's Fair.
He worked for radio station WOR (AM) in New York City. He was a radio personality in border radio for station XERF.
In the latter part of his life, he became a well-known painter of Texas landscapes and Western Americana themes and was often known to paint the backs of his used guitars.

Cinema
He worked in several westerns as a singing cowboy, including Swing in the Saddle (1944), Hidden Valley Days (1948) and Echo Ranch (1948).

Publications

Songs

Red River Dave's songs have been recorded by Hank Snow and Tex Ritter.

 "Amelia Earhart's Last Flight" 1937
 "The Blind Boy's Dog" ("I'd Like To Give My Dog To Uncle Sam")
 "The Red Deck of Cards" 1954
 "Ballad Of Emmett Till"
 "The Ballad Of Francis Powers" 1960
 "Trial of Francis Powers" 1960
 "The Flight Of Apollo Eleven" 1969
 "The California Hippy Murders"
 "The Ballad Of Patty Hearst"
 "The Ballad of Three Mile Island" 1979
 "Shame is the Middle Name Of Exxon"
 "Atlanta's Black Children" 1981
 "The Pine-Tarred Bat, the Ballad of George Brett" 1983
 "The Clinging Lovers of Kenya" 1983
 "Night That Ronald Reagan Rode With Santa Claus" 1984

References

1914 births
2002 deaths
People from San Antonio
American male composers
20th-century American composers
American country guitarists
American country singer-songwriters
American folk guitarists
American male guitarists
American folk singers
American male singer-songwriters
Singer-songwriters from Texas
Mexican radio presenters
Yodelers
20th-century American singers
20th-century American guitarists
Guitarists from Texas
Country musicians from Texas
20th-century American male singers